Punkunnam railway station (Station Code: PNQ) falls between Thrissur railway station and Mulankunnathukavu railway station in the busy Shoranur–Cochin Harbour section. Punkunnam railway station is operated by the Chennai-headquartered Southern Railways of the Indian Railways. The station is used as suburb station of Thrissur railway station. The station act as a junction where a spur line goes to Guruvayur railway station which is near to the famous Guruvayur Temple. All passenger trains and a few long-distance express trains stop at Punkunnam railway station.

See also
Ollur railway station
Chalakudi railway station
Guruvayur railway station
Wadakkanchery railway station
Mulankunnathukavu railway station
Thrissur Railway Passengers’ Association

References

Thiruvananthapuram railway division
Railway stations in Thrissur
Railway stations in Kerala